Daniel Enrique Martínez Bravo (born 4 November 1991) is a Uruguayan footballer who plays as a forward. He is currently a free agent.

Career
Martínez began his career in Uruguay with Bella Vista. He appeared once for the first-team, in a 2011 Copa Sudamericana first round second leg defeat to Universidad Católica. He departed the club in 2012 before signing for Plaza Colonia, for whom he scored three goals for in six matches.

Career statistics
.

References

External links

1991 births
Living people
People from San José de Mayo
Uruguayan footballers
Association football forwards
Uruguayan Primera División players
Uruguayan Segunda División players
C.A. Bella Vista players
Plaza Colonia players